Marlène Boissonnault (born June 19, 1997) is a Canadian ice hockey goaltender, currently affiliated with the Calgary chapter of the Professional Women's Hockey Players Association (PWHPA).

Playing career 
Across four years of NCAA Division I women's ice hockey with the Cornell Big Red of ECAC Hockey, Boissonnault finished with 56 wins, the second highest total in the university's history, and 15 shutouts, the third most in Cornell history. In 2019, the team made the Frozen Four.

After she graduated, she joined the Professional Women's Hockey Players Association (PWHPA), as the Canadian Women's Hockey League (CWHL) had just folded and she felt more aligned with the goals of the PWHPA than the National Women's Hockey League (NWHL).

International play  
Boissonnault represented Canada at the 2015 IIHF Women’s World U18 Championship, winning a silver medal. In 2017, she was named to the National Women’s Development Team roster.

Personal life 
Boissonnault has a pre-med degree from Cornell University.

References

External links
 
 

1997 births
Living people
Canadian women's ice hockey goaltenders
Ice hockey people from New Brunswick
People from Restigouche County, New Brunswick
Shenzhen KRS Vanke Rays players
Professional Women's Hockey Players Association players
Cornell Big Red women's ice hockey players